Outwitting Dad is a lost 1914 American comedy film that featured Oliver Hardy's first onscreen appearance. The master negatives and original print for this short were destroyed in a vault fire at the Lubin Manufacturing Company in Philadelphia, Pennsylvania, on June 13, 1914.

Plot

Cast
 Billy Bowers as Mr. Gross
 Oliver Hardy as Reggie Kewp (credited as O.N. Hardy)
 Raymond McKee as Bob Kewp
 Frances Ne Moyer as Lena Gross

See also
 List of American films of 1914
 Oliver Hardy filmography

References

External links

1914 films
1914 comedy films
1914 short films
Silent American comedy films
American silent short films
American black-and-white films
American comedy short films
Films directed by Arthur Hotaling
Films shot in Jacksonville, Florida
Lubin Manufacturing Company films
1910s American films